David Grier is an American acoustic guitarist.  He is considered to be one of the premier flatpicking guitarists in the world. His crosspicking, unique phrasing, and his ability to create multiple variations on a theme are hallmarks of his playing style.

Biography

Early history
Grier was born in Washington D.C. in 1961. His family moved to Nashville when he was 3, and began playing guitar at age 6. Grier's father Lamar was a banjo player in Bluegrass legend Bill Monroe's band for a number of years.

Roland White was a major musical influence on the young Grier, and helped him learn to play.  Grier's guitar playing is also heavily influenced by that of Clarence White, Roland's brother.

When he was 20 years old, Grier joined the Virginia band Full Time. During the 1980s, he performed with Country Gazette and Doug Dillard, and then began to record his own albums beginning with Freewheeling in 1988.

Psychograss
Grier performs solo and as a member of the group Psychograss, founded by Darol Anger and Mike Marshall.

Helen Highwater
In 2015, bluegrass supergroup Helen Highwater, consisting of Grier, Shad Cobb (fiddle), Missy Raines (bass), and Mike Compton (mandolin), released one self-titled EP.

Music instruction
Grier worked with Matt Flinner, Darol Anger, Tony Trischka, and Todd Phillips to prepare the All Star Bluegrass Jam Along instruction books and CDs for Homespun Music Instruction.

Musical instruments
Grier owns his father's 1955 Martin D-18.  The D-18 was his main guitar for a number of years but is now "retired."  He also played a Nashville Guitar Company dreadnought, built by renowned luthier Marty Lanham in Nashville, TN, the guitar was sold in 2009 with the music store Elderly Instruments. His current principal guitar is a Martin D-28 built in 1946.

Awards
Grier was named "Guitar Player of the Year" by the International Bluegrass Music Association three times (1992, 1993 and 1995).

Grier was recognized by Acoustic Guitar magazine as one of the top ten influential artists of the 1990s.

Discography

References

External links
 Official Website
 
 

American acoustic guitarists
American male guitarists
Living people
1961 births
Psychograss members
Fellows of the American Physical Society